Samuel Myron Brainerd (November 13, 1842 – November 21, 1898) was a Republican member of the U.S. House of Representatives from Pennsylvania.

Samuel M. Brainerd was born in Albion, Pennsylvania.  He attended the public schools, Edinboro Normal School, and University of Michigan Law School in Ann Arbor, Michigan.  He was admitted to the bar in 1869 and commenced practice in North East, Pennsylvania.  He served as district attorney of Erie County, Pennsylvania, from 1872 to 1875.  He moved to Erie, Pennsylvania, in 1874 and continued the practice of law.  He was chairman of the Republican county committee in 1880.

Brainerd was elected as a Republican to the Forty-eighth Congress.  He was an unsuccessful candidate for renomination in 1884.  He resumed the practice of law in Erie and died there in 1898.  Interment in Erie Cemetery.

Sources

The Political Graveyard

References

Pennsylvania lawyers
Politicians from Erie, Pennsylvania
1842 births
1898 deaths
University of Michigan Law School alumni
Edinboro University of Pennsylvania alumni
Republican Party members of the United States House of Representatives from Pennsylvania
19th-century American politicians
19th-century American lawyers